Kootenay was a provincial electoral district in the province of British Columbia, Canada, from 1871 to 1890.  It was originally a two-member riding until the 1875 election; from 1878, it was a one-member seat until its partition for the 1890 election into East Kootenay and West Kootenay.  For the 1966 election, the riding-name was re-established, but the area described was only the East Kootenay and included none of the West Kootenay.

Demographics

Geography

History

Notable MLAs

Election results 1871-1890 

|-

|Independent
|John Andrew Mara
|align="right"|17
|align="right"|43.59%
|align="right"|
|align="right"|unknown

|Independent
|William Cosgrove Milby
|align="right"|9
|align="right"|23.08%
|align="right"|
|align="right"|unknown

|Independent
|Charles Todd
|align="right"|13
|align="right"|13.33%
|align="right"|
|align="right"|unknown

|}

|-

|- bgcolor="white"
!align="right" colspan=3|Total valid votes
!align="right"|--
!align="right"|--%
!align="right"|
|- bgcolor="white"
!align="right" colspan=3|Total rejected ballots
!align="right"|
!align="right"|
!align="right"|
|- bgcolor="white"
!align="right" colspan=3|Turnout
!align="right"|
!align="right"|
!align="right"|
|- bgcolor="white"
!align="right" colspan=7|1  Seat reduced to one member from two.
|}

|-

|- bgcolor="white"
!align="right" colspan=3|Total valid votes
!align="right"|185
!align="right"|100.00%
!align="right"|
|- bgcolor="white"
!align="right" colspan=3|Total rejected ballots
!align="right"|
!align="right"|
!align="right"|
|- bgcolor="white"
!align="right" colspan=3|Turnout
!align="right"|%
!align="right"|
!align="right"|
|}

The riding was partitioned for the 1894 election.

Election results 1966-1986

The riding-name was re-established in time for the 1966 election, but covered only the East Kootenay region rather than the entire Kootenays as had been the case in its first incarnation.

|-

|NDP
|Leo Thomas Nimsick
|align="right"|3,605
|align="right"|40.98%
|align="right"|
|align="right"|unknown
|- bgcolor="white"
!align="right" colspan=3|Total valid votes
!align="right"|8.798
!align="right"|100.00%
!align="right"|
|- bgcolor="white"
!align="right" colspan=3|Total rejected ballots
!align="right"|
!align="right"|
!align="right"|
|- bgcolor="white"
!align="right" colspan=3|Turnout
!align="right"|%
!align="right"|
!align="right"|
|}

|-

|NDP
|Leo Thomas Nimsick
|align="right"|4,282
|align="right"|38.39%
|align="right"|
|align="right"|unknown
|- bgcolor="white"
!align="right" colspan=3|Total valid votes
!align="right"|11,712
!align="right"|100.00%
!align="right"|
|- bgcolor="white"
!align="right" colspan=3|Total rejected ballots
!align="right"|
!align="right"|
!align="right"|
|- bgcolor="white"
!align="right" colspan=3|Turnout
!align="right"|%
!align="right"|
!align="right"|
|}

|-

|NDP
|Leo Thomas Nimsick
|align="right"|6,065
|align="right"|44.20%
|align="right"|
|align="right"|unknown

|PC
|David John Reeves
|align="right"|4,169
|align="right"|30.38%
|align="right"|
|align="right"|unknown
|- bgcolor="white"
!align="right" colspan=3|Total valid votes
!align="right"|13,721
!align="right"|100.00%
!align="right"|
|- bgcolor="white"
!align="right" colspan=3|Total rejected ballots
!align="right"|
!align="right"|
!align="right"|
|- bgcolor="white"
!align="right" colspan=3|Turnout
!align="right"|%
!align="right"|
!align="right"|
|}

|-

|NDP
|Leo Thomas Nimsick
|align="right"|7,223
|align="right"|47.71%
|align="right"|
|align="right"|unknown
|- bgcolor="white"
!align="right" colspan=3|Total valid votes
!align="right"|15,138
!align="right"|100.00%
!align="right"|
|- bgcolor="white"
!align="right" colspan=3|Total rejected ballots
!align="right"|
!align="right"|
!align="right"|
|- bgcolor="white"
!align="right" colspan=3|Turnout
!align="right"|%
!align="right"|
!align="right"|
|}

|-

|PC
|Roy Wilburn Paul
|align="right"|975
|align="right"|7.80%
|align="right"|
|align="right"|unknown

|NDP
|Douglas Wayne Right
|align="right"|5,350
|align="right"|42.83%
|align="right"|
|align="right"|unknown
|- bgcolor="white"
!align="right" colspan=3|Total valid votes
!align="right"|12,492
!align="right"|100.00%
!align="right"|
|- bgcolor="white"
!align="right" colspan=3|Total rejected ballots
!align="right"|
!align="right"|
!align="right"|
|- bgcolor="white"
!align="right" colspan=3|Turnout
!align="right"|%
!align="right"|
!align="right"|
|}

|-

|NDP
|Harry Edwin Mathias
|align="right"|8,245
|align="right"|47.36%
|align="right"|
|align="right"|unknown

|- bgcolor="white"
!align="right" colspan=3|Total valid votes
!align="right"|12,492
!align="right"|100.00%
!align="right"|
|- bgcolor="white"
!align="right" colspan=3|Total rejected ballots
!align="right"|
!align="right"|
!align="right"|
|- bgcolor="white"
!align="right" colspan=3|Turnout
!align="right"|%
!align="right"|
!align="right"|
|}

|-

|NDP
|Kathleen Anne Edwards
|align="right"|8,000
|align="right"|47.94%
|align="right"|
|align="right"|unknown

|Progressive Conservative
|James G. Smith
|align="right"|499
|align="right"|2.99%
|align="right"|
|align="right"|unknown
|- bgcolor="white"
!align="right" colspan=3|Total valid votes
!align="right"|16,687
!align="right"|100.00%
!align="right"|
|- bgcolor="white"
!align="right" colspan=3|Total rejected ballots
!align="right"|
!align="right"|
!align="right"|
|- bgcolor="white"
!align="right" colspan=3|Turnout
!align="right"|%
!align="right"|
!align="right"|
|}

Sources
Elections BC Historical Returns 1871-1986

Former provincial electoral districts of British Columbia
Kootenays